Rongchang District is a district of Chongqing Municipality, China, bordering Sichuan province to the west.

The district, with a population of 800,000, is located in the west of Chongqing.

Administration

Climate

Notable people
 Shu Hongbing (born 1967) Chinese cytologist and immunologist

References

External links
Rongchang Government website

Districts of Chongqing